Halsey Stevens (December 3, 1908 – January 20, 1989) was a music professor, biographer, and composer of American music.

Life 
Halsey Stevens was born in Scott, New York and educated at Syracuse University and the University of California, Berkeley. He studied with William Berwald at Syracuse and with the composer Ernest Bloch at Berkeley.

Stevens served as a faculty member at Syracuse University (1935–1937), Dakota Wesleyan University (1937–1941), Bradley University (1941–1946), the University of Redlands (1946), and then at the University of Southern California from 1946 until his retirement in 1976. His notable students there included Charles Lloyd, Houston Bright, Benjamin Lees, Morten Lauridsen, and Williametta Spencer. 

He died in a Long Beach, California, medical facility on January 20, 1989, after a long battle with Parkinson's disease.

Music 
His recorded music includes, in chronological order of composition:
 "Go, Lovely Rose," for mixed chorus (SATB) a cappella (1942)
 Quintet for Flute, Piano, Violin, Viola, and Cello (1945)
 Symphony No. 1 (1945)
 Three Inventions for Piano (1948)
 Sonata for French Horn and Piano (1953)
 Triskelion, for orchestra (1953)
 Five Duos for Two Cellos (1954)
 Intrada for Piano (1954)
 "Like as the Culver on the Barèd Bough," for mixed chorus (SSATB) a cappella (1954)
 Partita for Harpsichord (1954)
 The Ballad of William Sycamore, for mixed chorus (SATB) and orchestra (1955)
 Sonata for Trumpet and Piano (1956)
 Sonata Piacevole for recorder and harpsichord (1956)
 Sinfonia Breve, for orchestra (1957)
 Symphonic Dances (1958)
 Sonata for [Unaccompanied] Cello (1958)
 Sonatina for Tuba [or Bass Trombone] and Piano (1960)
 Sonata for Trombone and Piano (1965)
 Campion Suite, for mixed chorus (SATB) a cappella (1967)
 Concerto for Clarinet and String Orchestra (1969)
along with many other works.

Among his chamber works, Stevens's 1956 trumpet sonata remains a particular favorite, having been commercially recorded by over a half-dozen trumpeters, including Giuseppe Galante, Jouko Harjanne, David Hickman, Wynton Marsalis, Anthony Plog, Scott Thornburg, and George Vosburgh.

A present-day music reviewer, Osvaldo Polatkan, sought in 2008 to convey something of the composer's models, influences, and mature style thus:

Writings 

A Bartók scholar and musicologist, Stevens wrote a definitive study of the Hungarian composer, The Life and Music of Béla Bartók (Oxford University Press, 1953; revised edition, 1964). "Mr. Stevens' book... makes one want to rehear the Bartok works in the light of what the author has found in them," observed eminent fellow composer Aaron Copland. "That is praise indeed for any book on music."

Stevens also contributed scholarly articles to Musical Quarterly, The Journal of Music Theory, Music and Letters (London), Tempo (London), Énekszós (Budapest), Musikoloski Zborník (Ljubljana), among other journals.

References

Sources 
Composer biography at Halsey Stevens.com. Accessed November 15, 2012.

External links 

 Official web site dedicated to Halsey Stevens and his music (published under the Editio Helios colophon); operated by Stevens family members. Accessed November 15, 2012.

1908 births
1989 deaths
20th-century classical composers
American male classical composers
American classical composers
Syracuse University alumni
University of California, Berkeley alumni
Syracuse University faculty
Dakota Wesleyan University faculty
Bradley University faculty
University of Redlands faculty
University of Southern California faculty
People from Scott, New York
American writers about music
20th-century American non-fiction writers
Pupils of Ernest Bloch
20th-century American male writers
20th-century American composers
American male non-fiction writers
20th-century American male musicians
Bartók scholars